Kimberly Denise Jones (born July 11, 1974), better known by her stage name Lil' Kim, is an American rapper and reality television personality. She was born and raised in Brooklyn, New York City, where she lived much of her adolescent life on the streets after being expelled from home. In her teens, Jones would freestyle rap, influenced by fellow female hip hop rappers like MC Lyte and the Lady of Rage. In 1994, she was discovered by fellow rapper The Notorious B.I.G., who invited her to join his group Junior M.A.F.I.A.; their debut album, Conspiracy, generated two top 20 singles in the United States and was certified gold by the Recording Industry Association of America (RIAA).

Lil' Kim's debut studio album, Hard Core (1996) was certified double platinum, has since sold more than six million copies worldwide, and spawned three successful singles: "No Time", "Not Tonight (Ladies Night)", and "Crush on You". It had the highest debut in the US for a female rap album at the time. Her following albums, The Notorious K.I.M. (2000) and La Bella Mafia (2003) were also certified platinum. In 2001, Lil' Kim reached number one on the U.S. Billboard Hot 100 with the single "Lady Marmalade" (a remake of LaBelle' 1974 single), alongside Mýa, Pink, and Christina Aguilera. Other notable singles from this period include "The Jump Off" and "Magic Stick", the latter of which reached number two on the Billboard Hot 100, becoming Kim's 2nd-highest-charting single as a lead artist.

In 2005, Lil' Kim served a one-year prison sentence for lying to a jury about her friends' involvement in a shooting four years earlier. During her incarceration, her fourth album, The Naked Truth, was released to positive reviews from critics. A reality series covering her sentence, Lil' Kim: Countdown to Lockdown, premiered on BET in 2006. She then released her first mixtape, Ms. G.O.A.T. (2008), and returned to the public eye in 2009 with an appearance on Dancing with the Stars. Throughout the 2010s, she continued to release music and perform sporadically, collaborating with artists such as Faith Evans, Remy Ma, and Fabolous. Her fifth studio album, 9, was released in 2019.

Lil' Kim has been referred to as the "Queen of Rap", as well as her alias "Queen Bee" by several media outlets. She has sold more than 15 million albums and 30 million singles worldwide. Her songs "No Time", "Big Momma Thang", and "Not Tonight (Ladies Night)" were each listed on Complex's list of the 50 Best Rap Songs By Women. In 2012, Lil' Kim was listed on VH1's 100 Greatest Women in Music list at number 45, the second highest position for a solo female hip-hop artist. Aside from music, Lil' Kim is also known for her risk-taking and luxurious approach to fashion that inspired many artists; she has been cited as a fashion icon. She has been noted for helping women embrace their "sexuality and femininity" in a way that was a stark contrast at the time from other female artists.

Early life, family and education 
Jones was born in the Bedford–Stuyvesant neighborhood of Brooklyn, New York City, New York, the second child of Linwood Jones, a former U.S. Marine. She has an older brother, Christopher. As a child, Jones attended Queen of All Saints Elementary School in Brooklyn. When she was nine years old, her parents separated, and Jones was raised by her father, with whom she had a tumultuous relationship. At fourteen, she left home, began living on the streets, and ended up dropping out of high school.

As a teenager, Jones met Christopher Wallace, known professionally as the Notorious B.I.G., who was a key figure in both her personal and artistic life, particularly after Wallace gained popularity and influence through his relationship with Bad Boy Records, founded by Sean "Puffy" Combs. Jones attended Sarah J. Hale Vocational High School for two and a half years. Many of her friends also went there, and they would all often skip school together. Since she was not completing her schoolwork, the decision was made for her to transfer to Brooklyn College Academy to finish her remaining year and half of high school. This was the same school that fellow rappers Nas and Foxy Brown attended.

Career 
In the year of 1994, B.I.G. was instrumental in introducing and promoting the Brooklyn-based group Junior M.A.F.I.A., which included Jones, who adopted the stage name Lil' Kim and was 19 at the time. The group's album, Conspiracy, was released to mediocre reviews and moderate sales on August 29, 1995, but debuted at number eight on the U.S. Billboard 200 chart, selling 69,000 copies in its first week of release. Wallace wrote and ghostwrote most of the album's material. Three hit singles came from Conspiracy: "Player's Anthem", "I Need You Tonight", and "Get Money". The RIAA certified Conspiracy gold on December 6, 1995. "Player's Anthem" and "Get Money" were certified gold and platinum respectively. Lil' Kim's increasing popularity as a member of Junior M.A.F.I.A. allowed her to start a solo career shortly after the Conspiracy album was released, and she began working on what would become her debut album Hard Core by late 1995.

1996–2002: Hard Core and The Notorious K.I.M. 
After a year with Junior M.A.F.I.A., Lil' Kim began her solo career by making guest performances on R&B albums and recording her debut album, Hard Core, which was released in November 1996. The album debuted at number 11 on the Billboard 200, the highest debut for a female rap album at that time, and number 3 on Billboards Top R&B/Hip-Hop Albums, selling 78,000 copies in its first week of release and has sold over 5 million copies worldwide. Hard Core was certified double platinum by the RIAA on March 14, 2001, after having been certified gold on January 6, 1997, and platinum on June 3, 1997.

The album's lead single "No Time", a duet with Combs, reached the top spot of the Billboard Hot Rap Tracks chart and was certified gold by the RIAA. The following single was "Crush on You", a remixed version of the track that appeared on Hard Core. A remix of the album's track "Not Tonight" saw Lil' Kim team up with Missy Elliott, Angie Martinez, Da Brat and Left Eye of TLC with the song peaking at 6 on the Billboard Hot 100. The song was part of the soundtrack to the Martin Lawrence movie Nothing to Lose, nominated for a Grammy Award, and certified platinum. She became the first female rapper to have three consecutive number ones on the Billboard Hot Rap Tracks chart.

In one stockholders' meeting of Warner Bros. Records, activist C. Delores Tucker criticized the label "for producing this filth", referring to perceived graphic sexual content in Lil' Kim's lyrics, and labeling them "gangsta porno rap". In 1997, Lil' Kim promoted Hard Core by performing on P. Diddy's "No Way Out" tour. The tour continued through to 1998 and became one of the highest grossing hip-hop tours of all time, grossing an estimated $16 million. That same year, she launched her own label Queen Bee Entertainment.

From 1998 to 2000, Lil' Kim continued working under the management of B.I.G.'s best friend, Damion "D-Roc" Butler's "Roc Management", touring and modeling for various fashion and pop culture companies including Candie's, Versace, Iceberg, and Baby Phat. Her outfit at the 1999 MTV Video Music Awards received widespread media attention, fueled by the "shocked" response of presenter Diana Ross, who approached and jiggled Kim's exposed breast on national television. The Washington Post considered that the incident solidified Lil' Kim's "image of sexual fearlessness" and her career as "a fashion trendsetter."

On June 27, 2000, Lil' Kim released her second album, The Notorious K.I.M. The album marked a new image and revamped look for the rapper. Despite the limited success of its singles, the album debuted at number 4 on the Billboard 200 and number 1 on the Top R&B/Hip-Hop Albums chart, selling 229,000 copies in its first week. It was certified platinum by the RIAA, four weeks after its release. It was on this LP that the well-known hip-hop feud between Lil' Kim and Foxy Brown escalated. In 2001, Lil' Kim teamed up with Christina Aguilera, Pink, and Mýa to remake "Lady Marmalade", which was originally written about a bordello in New Orleans and performed by the group Labelle (which included diva Patti LaBelle) 25 years earlier.

The song was recorded for the Moulin Rouge! film soundtrack, released in April 2001, and stayed number 1 on the Billboard Hot 100 for five weeks. The song also went to number 1 in 50 countries around the world. This was a big accomplishment for female rap, as well as for Lil' Kim, who scored her first number 1 Hot 100 hit and became the second solo female rapper in history to hit number one on the Billboard Hot 100 charts.

"Lady Marmalade" also garnered Lil' Kim her first Grammy Award. The second single, "Kimnotyze", was released as the lead single of record producer DJ Tomekk's compilation album Beat Of Life, Vol 1. It was released in Switzerland, Austria and Germany only. The song was successful, becoming Lil' Kim's third consecutive top 10 hit in Germany after her number 5 hit "Lady Marmalade".

In 2002, Lil' Kim recorded a new entrance theme for then World Wrestling Entertainment (WWE) Women's Champion Trish Stratus entitled "Time to Rock 'n Roll", which was used during broadcasts, until Stratus' retirement. The single was released on WWE Anthology, a compilation of entrance theme music to various professional wrestling superstars. Lil' Kim released the song "Whats The Word" in mid-2002. Despite not having an official release, it went on to peak at number 9 on the Bubbling Under R&B/Hip-Hop Singles chart. It would later be released on the Japan edition of her third studio album, La Bella Mafia, as a bonus track.

2003–2005: La Bella Mafia 
On March 4, 2003, Lil' Kim released her third studio album, La Bella Mafia. It debuted at number 5 on the Billboard 200, selling 166,000 copies in its first week, giving Lil' Kim her second consecutive top 5 album. The album received generally positive reviews from critics, receiving a score of 65 on Metacritic. A buzz single, "Came Back For You", was released ahead of the album, the music video for the song featured reality television personality Victoria Gotti.

The first single, "The Jump Off", featuring Mr. Cheeks, peaked at number 16 on the Billboard Hot 100. Follow up single, "Magic Stick", featuring 50 Cent, peaked at number two on the Billboard Hot 100, staying there for three weeks. The song did not have a commercial release or a music video, but was successful due to high radio airplay, peaking at number one on the Billboard Airplay chart. A third US only single, "Thug Luv", featuring Twista, was released in the last quarter of 2003 at peaked at number 60 on the Billboard Hot R&B/Hip-Hop Songs chart. The album was certified platinum in the US, selling over 1.1 million copies.

Lil' Kim promoted the album with a string of concerts, which also featured DMX and Nas. Lil' Kim was nominated for five Source Awards and won two ("Female Hip-Hop Artist of the Year", and "Female Single of the Year"). The album also got two Grammy Award nominations for Best Female Rap Solo Performance ("Came Back For You") and Best Rap Collaboration ("Magic Stick"). She was also nominated for Best Pop Collaboration with singer Christina Aguilera for the song "Can't Hold Us Down", from Aguilera's album Stripped.

Greg Thomas, an English professor at Syracuse University, began teaching "Hip-Hop Eshu: Queen B@#$H Lyricism 101". Lil' Kim herself was a guest speaker at the school. Professor Thomas considered Lil' Kim's lyrics "the art with the most profound sexual politics I've ever seen anywhere." David Horowitz criticized the course as "academic degeneracy and decline". Lil' Kim also made an appearance on the multi-platform videogame Def Jam: Fight for NY. Lil' Kim provided voice-overs for her part in the storyline, where the player may fight an opponent to have Lil' Kim as their girlfriend.

In 2004, Lil' Kim recorded a cover of "These Boots Are Made for Walkin'" which was used as the opening theme for Victoria Gotti's reality series Growing Up Gotti. The same year Lil' Kim was featured on the remix of "Naughty Girl" by Beyoncé. In December 2004, Lil' Kim began recording a pilot for a VH1 reality show titled 718 Makeover. The 718 in the title is the area code for Brooklyn, where Lil' Kim grew up. The show did not make it to air.

2005–2008: Prison, The Naked Truth and Ms. G.O.A.T 

Lil' Kim released her fourth album, The Naked Truth, on September 27, 2005, while serving a federal prison sentence. It earned her a 5 mic rating from The Source, making her the only female rapper to ever receive a 5 mic rating. The album debuted at number 6 on the Billboard 200 chart, selling 109,000 copies in its first week of release, giving Lil' Kim her third top 10 debut on the chart. The Naked Truth did not sell as well as her previous works, it only managed to reach a gold certification by RIAA. She said that her prison sentence left her with no time to promote the project.

The music video for The Naked Truth first single, "Lighters Up", was number one on BET's 106 & Park for two weeks. "Lighters Up" was a Top Ten hit on the Billboard Hot R&B/Hip-Hop Singles & Tracks chart. The single also reached number. 67 on the German Single Chart, number 12 on the UK Top 75 and number 4 on the Finland Single Chart. The second single, "Whoa" was released on February 17, 2006. It reached number 22 on Airplay.

On March 9, 2006, BET premiered the show Lil' Kim: Countdown to Lockdown, which was filmed before Lil' Kim headed to prison. The show became the highest rated premiere in BET history, averaging 1.9 million viewers. In May 2006, Debbie Harry released a song in tribute to Lil' Kim called "Dirty and Deep" in protest of her conviction. The song was available for free from her official website. Dance Remixes, her first compilation album, was released on June 6, 2006. The album featured remixes of songs from The Naked Truth and Hard Core.

A limited pressing released only in the US, it received no promotion, due to Lil' Kim being in prison at the time of release, and failed to chart. On August 31, 2006, Lil' Kim presented the award for Best Male Video at the 2006 MTV Video Music Awards, it marked her first televised appearance since being released from prison. She also made appearances on the show The Pussycat Dolls Present: The Search for the Next Doll and Pussycat Dolls Present: Girlicious in 2007 and 2008 as a judge.

In January 2008, Lil' Kim announced that she had parted ways with Atlantic Records, choosing to release future projects independently. She stated she had no hard feelings towards Atlantic but felt more comfortable in her knowledge of the music business to do it alone. Lil' Kim released her first mixtape, Ms. G.O.A.T., an acronym for "Greatest of All Time", on June 3, 2008. It was produced by New York City DJs Mister Cee and DJ Whoo Kid. Among critics, the mixtape received generally positive reviews. It has been called a representation of Lil' Kim's return to the streets. Tito Salinas of All Hip Hop says "Lil' Kim shows that her time behind bars did not rust all of her swag away" on Ms. G.O.A.T. On the other hand, Ehren Gresehover of New York Mag says that although one of the tracks "The Miseducation of Lil' Kim" is not bad, he wished that it was Lauryn Hill who was making a comeback instead.

2009–2011: Dancing with the Stars and Black Friday 
On March 10, 2009, the song "Girls" by Korean singer Seven featuring Lil' Kim was released through digital stores as his U.S. debut single. Lil' Kim appeared in the music video that was released on the same day. "Girls" was produced by Darkchild. On March 24, 2009, she released the song "Download" featuring R&B singers T-Pain and Charlie Wilson. It was written by Lil' Kim and T-Pain and produced by Trackmasters. The song samples "Computer Love" by Zapp. Although it missed the Hot 100, it did chart on the Billboard Hot R&B/Hip-Hop Songs chart, peaking at number 21.

Lil' Kim appeared on the eighth season of reality series Dancing with the Stars, which began airing on March 9, 2009. She was paired with professional dancer Derek Hough until the dance couple was eliminated on May 5, 2009, against Ty Murray and his partner Chelsie Hightower, putting her at fifth place from all thirteen contestants that season. Her elimination was met by many boos from the audience, as she was a consistent high-scorer and a fan favorite.

On February 16, 2010, the Ludacris song "Hey Ho", which featured Lil' Kim and Lil Fate, was released as a promo single for his seventh studio album Battle of the Sexes. In June 2010, Lil' Kim started her 2010 Tour, her first headlining tour since 2000. It took her across the US, as well as Canada and Europe.

Lil' Kim released her second mixtape, Black Friday, on February 14, 2011. The video for the title track was released on February 16, 2011. The mixtape received mostly negative reviews from critics. It was made available for purchase via PayPal. In May 2011, Lil' Kim performed in South Africa as part of the music festival ZarFest alongside Fat Joe, Timbaland and Ciara.

On June 19, 2011, Lil' Kim performed alongside G-Unit member Shawty Lo and hinted a possible working relationship with G-Unit Records. That same month the song Lil' Kim, along with Rick Ross, was featured on titled "Anything (To Find You)", by R&B singer Monica was leaked. The song, which samples the Notorious B.I.G.'s "Who Shot Ya?", initially featured just Lil' Kim, but her second verse was removed to make room for Ross. Her vocals were then removed fully due to contractual issues with B.I.G.'s estate.

In August 2011, Lil' Kim performed four dates in Australia as part of the WinterBeatz Festival alongside Fabolous, Mario, 50 Cent and G-Unit. During the August, 17 date in Perth, she joined 50 Cent on stage for a performance of "Magic Stick". It marked the first time the pair had performed the song together. On November 28, 2011, Lil' Kim released a buzz single called "I Am Not the One". She also announced that she would release an EP, but it was later shelved for unknown reasons.

2012–2016: Hardcore Mixtape and Lil' Kim Season 
In the summer of 2011, Lil' Kim began recording material for her fifth studio album, as a restriction banning her from releasing new material as a result of her settlement with Trackmasters was lifted. On Valentine's Day, 2012, Lil' Kim released the song "If You Love Me" produced by Prince Saheb of Knockout Entertainment as a gift to her fans. That same month it was announced she would make her return to the stage on BET's Rip the Runway. It marked her first televised performance in years.

In March 2012, during an interview with MTV's Sucker Free, Lil' Kim revealed that contract issues with production duo Trackmasters were the reason behind her album delay, saying "...contractually, by the courts, I could not record any music – I wasn't supposed to put any music out." On March 23, 2012, the song "Keys to the City", a collaboration with Young Jeezy, was leaked to the Internet. Lil' Kim first mentioned the song during an interview with MTV's RapFix, saying "I have a song with another celebrity person that I know the world and my fans are gonna love... It's vintage Kim mixed with the new Kim." During the same RapFix interview, Lil' Kim also revealed another song, titled "I'm Ready", which she hopes to do with rapper 50 Cent. Lil' Kim also commented on the direction of her music, saying she was in "Kanye West mode", adding "...You do whatever you want to do ...it's all about taking chances". Lil' Kim kicked off her Return of the Queen Tour on May 17, 2012, to positive reviews.

In a radio interview at 99 Jamz, Lil' Kim stated that her upcoming book, The Price of Loyalty, is on hold to coincide with the release of her new album. During an interview with XXL on April 26, 2013, Lil' Kim revealed that she does not have a name for the album yet, but the first official single would be out by mid year. Lil' Kim described the single, produced by Bangladesh, as "different" and "sweet dessert". On July 11, 2013, Lil' Kim released the Rockwilder-produced single "Looks Like Money" as a free download to her fans on her birthday.

On July 26, 2013, Lil' Kim announced and released the cover art for a new mixtape entitled Hard Core 2K13, which will also serve as a sequel to her critically acclaimed debut album, Hard Core. The mixtape was originally set to be released on October 31, 2013, but for unknown reasons, was pushed back. To make up for not releasing the mixtape, Lil' Kim released the singles "Dead Gal Walking" and "Kimmy Blanco" to the public, along with the track list. The track list revealed collaborations with French Montana, Miley Cyrus, Jadakiss, and Yo Gotti.

On August 2, 2014, Lil' Kim announced via her Twitter page that she would be launching a concert tour to promote her forthcoming Hard Core Mixtape. Throughout the remainder of the month of August, Lil' Kim released a number of remixes to popular songs, including a remix to Beyoncé's and Nicki Minaj's collaboration of "Flawless", seemingly as a diss to Minaj, reigniting the rap feud between the two rappers.

On September 11, 2014, the Hard Core mixtape was released as free download on Kim's official website. In an interview with Revolt TV on the same day, Lil' Kim revealed that she, Iggy Azalea, and T.I. would be collaborating on a song sometime in the future, saying "I don't know if it's going to be for my album or if we're just going to…we have other plans for it as well. But, I think we're going to do a double release." In the same interview, she explained the reasons why the mixtape was pushed back twice, stating "When this project was supposed to come out I had got pregnant. I didn't know. [...] Once I became fully pregnant, I was working in the studio but at one point I couldn't work anymore, obviously".

In 2016, Lil' Kim's fourth mixtape Lil Kim Season was released. On the mixtape, she freestyles over several popular beats, Drake's "Summer Sixteen", Rihanna's "Work", and Desiigner's "Panda". Upon release, the mixtape received mixed reviews from critics. Jen Yamato from The Daily Beast wrote, "if anything, Lil Kim Season indicates that Kim's got her sights set on returning in a big way—and that she's collecting collaborators who might help her achieve it."

2017–present: Girls Cruise and 9
In February 2017, Lil' Kim announced via her Instagram account and an interview that she is working on a new album set to be released in 2019. Lil' Kim was featured on the song "Lovin You for Life" from the album The King & I, by singer Faith Evans, which was released on May 19, 2017. That same month, Lil' Kim along with Eve and Trina was featured on the remix of "I'm Better" by Missy Elliott.  In November, Lil' Kim released a promotional single "Took Us a Break", and was featured on the song "Wake Me Up" by rapper Remy Ma. In March 2018, Lil' Kim released another promotional single "Spicy" featured rapper Fabolous.

On July 11, 2018, Lil' Kim released the single "Nasty One" which was anticipated to be a single from her highly anticipated album (the track would later go on to not be included). That same day during an interview with Billboard, Lil' Kim revealed that her upcoming album would be released in November 2018. A remix for the single was released on October 26, 2018, and featured Kranium, HoodCelebrityy, and Stefflon Don.

In September 2018, it was revealed that the debut single for her album, titled "Go Awff" would be released at a later date. The song was eventually released on February 15, 2019. That same month, Kim was spotted in Barbados with fellow hip hop stars Mýa and Chilli, friends Char DeFrancesco (husband to Marc Jacobs one of Kim's best friends) and Tiffany,  as well as  MTV personalities Pretty Vee and B. Simone from MTV's Wild 'n Out.

It was later revealed that this was part of a reality show titled Girls Cruise to be broadcast on VH1, of which Kim would serve as an executive producer. The show followed the group as they set sail to embark on a 10-day cruise in the Caribbean visiting the countries of Barbados and Trinidad just in time for Carnival festivities and also documented the group's bonding and new friendships with one another. The show premiered on July 15 with approximately 1.2 million viewers and ran for 11 episodes. It is unclear if there will be an upcoming season of the series.

In March 2019, Kim revealed that her new album would be titled 9 and added "There's a lot of meaning behind that." Later that month, she announced that the album would be released on May 17, 2019. After a minor setback with her record label, eOne Music, that caused the album not be released on the original planned date, the project was postponed. On September 27, 2019, Kim released a second single titled "Found You" featuring City Girls and O.T. Genasis. The album later became available for pre-order on all digital-download platforms on October 4, 2019 (along with the track "Pray For Me" featuring Rick Ross and Musiq Soulchild) with a release date set for October 11, 2019.

Upon its first week of release, the album charted on the R&B/Hip-Hop and Rap Album Sales, Digital Albums, Top Albums Sales, Independent Albums and Rap Album Sales. However, the album failed to chart on the Billboard 200 due to selling less than 1,000 copies, and no song from the album landed on the Hot 100 or Bubbling Under. During one of the reunion episodes for Girls Cruise, Kim revealed that the album would be a two-part project, stating "I recorded so many songs. I have a part one and a part two." She also shared that her co-star and Instagram comedian Vena "Pretty Vee" Excell will make an appearance on the record.

In October 2019, Kim revealed that she will have a collaboration with Missy Elliott and Paris Hilton on the follow-up to 9. In an interview with Radio 103.9, Kim confirmed that the City Girls would be involved with the follow-up to 9. She also stated that she would "love" to have Pretty Vee host her tour. On her November 8, 2019 appearance on The Real, Kim again confirmed that Paris Hilton and Missy Elliott will appear on 9s follow-up; she said the song "sounds like a classic Missy Elliott record but 'now.'"(1:20)

Influences 
Lil' Kim cited as her rap influences MC Lyte, Salt-N-Pepa and Roxanne Shanté. She was also influenced by Slick Rick, The Notorious B.I.G., Eric B. & Rakim, Queen Latifah and Mary J. Blige. Lil' Kim also cited Madonna as an influence, and stated she modeled her own career in that of Madonna, labeling herself as the "Black Madonna".

Products and endorsements 
In 1998, Lil' Kim signed to Wilhelmina Models. That same year she was announced as the face for the fashion brand Candie's alongside Brandy. She became the first and only rapper to endorse the brand to date. In 2000, Lil' Kim signed a deal with fashion house Iceberg, and also with cosmetics brand MAC to help endorse their VIVA GLAM line of lipsticks and lip glosses alongside Mary J. Blige.

The MAC VIVA GLAM III campaign, which was built around a plum-brown lipstick, helped raise $4 million for the company in one year and became the most successful VIVA GLAM campaign to date. Due to the success, the two signed on for a second year. The rapper also modeled for the urban fashion line Baby Phat in August 2000. In March 2001, Lil' Kim, along with several other artists, featured in a commercial for Apple's Mac computers. It highlighted how users can burn custom CD's on their Mac.

In 2004, it was announced that Lil' Kim would launch a designer watch collection, titled Royalty by Lil' Kim. Jeweler Jacob Arabo manufactured the watches. She also debuted her first clothing line, entitled Hollyhood. Lil' Kim also lent her voice to the video game Def Jam: Fight for NY which she was featured in. In 2005, Lil' Kim collaborated on a shoe line with high end shoe store, Petite Peton. That same year Lil' Kim was featured as a character in the limited edition comic book "The Heist". The book was a collaboration between Marvel and Atlantic Records.

In August 2010, Lil' Kim signed a deal with Three Olives Vodka to become the face for their Purple vodka. In September of that same year, Lil' Kim, along with her cousin, Katrise Jones, opened their first beauty salon in Charlotte, North Carolina called Salon Se Swa. That same month, Lil' Kim also launched her second clothing line, entitled 24/7 Goddess Collection, at Charlotte NC Fashion Week. In November 2012, Lil' Kim began endorsing Cîroc vodka, revealing her own cocktail, titled "Queen Bee", and announcing herself as the "First Lady" of the brand.

Philanthropy 
In 2000, Lil' Kim embarked on a promo tour in support of her second studio album, The Notorious K.I.M., and the MAC AIDS Fund. She visited MAC cosmetics counters, interacted with fans and help raise money and awareness for the cause, which helps people who are living with HIV/AIDS worldwide. She took part in MAC's Fashion Cares show in Toronto, Canada. The show raised close to one million for the AIDS Committee of Toronto.

Her endorsement for MAC, with Mary J. Blige, would go on to raise $4 million for the fund. In October 2001, Lil' Kim was featured on the R&B mix of the song "What's Going On". Lil' Kim, along with several other popular recording artists, released the song under the name "Artists Against AIDS Worldwide", with proceeds going to AIDS programs worldwide and also United Ways September 11th Fund. That same month, Lil' Kim performed at Breathe, a benefit concert for breast cancer research and treatment. Proceeds from the concert went to the UCLA Breast Center and the Breast Examination Center of Harlem, an outreach program of the Memorial Sloan Kettering Cancer Center.

On March 12, 2002, Lil' Kim walked her dogs in the 3rd annual "Paws for Style" fashion show. The event is held by Animal Fair magazine as a benefit for the Humane Society of New York. Items worn by the animals were later auctioned off online. In 2004, Lil' Kim started her own foundation called Lil' Kim Cares. The foundation raises funds, resources and awareness for national programs that assist with issues of homelessness, HIV/AIDS prevention and awareness, transitional living, child neglect and violence against women.

Speaking about the foundation, Lil' Kim stated she planned to be involved in a number of causes, most of which had affected her personally in past years. On April 17, 2004, Lil' Kim participated in the 28th annual Toyota Pro/Celebrity Race. The event helped raise more than $100,000 for "Racing for Kids", a non-profit program benefiting Southern California children's hospitals in Long Beach and Orange County. On August 24, 2004, Lil' Kim encouraged others to vote in the United States presidential election through the Rock the Vote campaign.

On March 10, 2005, Lil' Kim, along with several other artists, appeared in an episode of The Apprentice. Each artist was approached by contestants to donate a "personal experience" to be auctioned off for charity through music channel Fuse's "Daily Download" program with proceeds going to the Elizabeth Glaser Pediatric AIDS Foundation. In September 2005, Lil' Kim paired up with fashion designer Marc Jacobs for a limited edition T-shirt line featuring images of the rapper. The shirts, titled Marc Jacobs Loves Lil' Kim, were sold exclusively at Marc Jacob stores with 100% of the proceeds going to The Door.

In 2005 Lil' Kim donated a diamond watch from her "Royalty" watch line to the World AIDS Day eBay auction titled "Bid 2 Beat AIDS". Proceeds went to LIFEbeat, an organization providing HIV/AIDS information to millions of young people annually. Through her foundation, Lil' Kim has given back to many, including teaming up with apparel company Mitchell & Ness and boxer Zab Judah to donate toys to underprivileged youth in Philadelphia in 2005, and teaming up with MusiCares in 2007 for a silent auction, held at the Grammys On The Hill ceremony, to help raise funds for the foundation.

In 2007 Lil' Kim was a part of the 4th Annual Grammy Charity Holiday Auction, which featured a large variety of celebrity-signed memorabilia that people could bid on through the online auction site eBay. On December 1, 2007, Lil' Kim teamed up with Preserve Our Legacy and the New Jersey Stem Cell Research and Education Foundation to put on a celebrity basketball game to raise awareness about various health issues plaguing minority communities.

On July 11, 2010, Lil' Kim had  launched her signature milkshake, titled "Queen Bee", at Millions of Milkshakes in West Hollywood, with proceeds going towards Wyclef Jean's Yéle Haiti Foundation. On February 9, 2013, Lil' Kim took part in the first annual Reality On The Runway fashion show. The event wanted to help raise $300,000 for people infected with HIV/AIDS and increase awareness. All designs from the show were auctioned off online following the event with a portion of the proceeds going to AIDS United.

Lil' Kim has been a longtime LGBT advocate and has participated in many gay pride festivals, including the LGBT Pride March in New York City, as well as performing at Atlanta Black Pride and D.C. Black Pride.

Personal life 
In her teens, Jones dated Shawn Powell. The pair met at the Empire Roller Skating rink in Brooklyn. After a couple of months of seeing each other, Powell was arrested for robbery and was sentenced to eight and a half years in prison. Jones and Powell continued their relationship with Jones visiting frequently and kept in touch by writing letters to each other. The couple became engaged while he was incarcerated.

During this time, Jones met Christopher Wallace (The Notorious B.I.G.). With Jones focusing on starting her rap career, the engagement to Powell was eventually called off and the couple split. In 1996, during the recording of her debut album, Jones became pregnant with Wallace's child. Jones did not make it public until 1999 during an interview with The Source. Jones decided to terminate the pregnancy. "I already knew the kind of relationship that Biggie and I had, and I knew that [having a child] was something that couldn't take place..."

Wallace called Jones three days before his death and told her he loved her. In a 2010 interview with Ed Lover on Power 105, Jones revealed that Wallace assaulted her and she described an incident where he choked her to unconsciousness. In 2017, Jones admitted her relationship with Wallace was "very violent" after Jermaine Dupri claimed that he witnessed Wallace pull a pistol out on Jones.

On July 23, 1996, Jones was arrested for possession of marijuana after police raided the Teaneck, New Jersey home of Wallace. The arrest came after police smelled marijuana inside the home when they went to ask for someone to move an illegally parked car. Jones denied she was smoking, claiming she was "upstairs all day sleeping". On March 17, 1999, Teaneck police issued an arrest warrant after Jones failed to turn up to court dates stemming from the arrest.

The warrant was not a top priority for the police and was not made public until September 2003, after the story was published online by The Smoking Gun. Jones was later removed from Teaneck's wanted list in October 2003, after $350 in bail was posted on her behalf. Jones' attorney told reporters that she did not appear in court as she believed the case had been resolved.

In 2002, Jones started dating Damion "World" Hardy. The couple split in 2003. It was during this time that Jones had been a victim of physical abuse. Jones also stated how she had to have multiple nose jobs due to being punched.

On June 20, 2003, Jones had $250,000 worth of jewelry stolen from her while catching a flight at New York's John F. Kennedy International Airport after a bag, which she intended to carry on, was mixed up with eight other pieces of her luggage. The missing jewelry was recovered 10 days later, found wrapped up in a rag in a locker room for airline employees by a United Airlines worker.

In 2004, Jones dated record producer Scott Storch. The two met when Storch offered Jones a ride to her hotel. The couple split after 2 months. In 2013, Storch revealed that he would have married Jones if the relationship had worked out. In 2007, Jones and Ray J briefly dated.

On March 17, 2005, Lil' Kim was convicted of three counts of conspiracy and one count of perjury for lying to a federal grand jury about her and her friends' involvement in a 2001 shooting outside the Hot 97 studios in Manhattan. During the trial of her co-manager, Damion "D-Roc" Butler, and her bodyguard, Suif "Gutta" Jackson, a former member of the hip hop group Junior M.A.F.I.A, she testified not to have known they were at the scene. However, video footage from a security camera placed all three at the scene, exiting the building. This directly contravened testimony before the grand jury.

Butler and Jackson pleaded guilty to gun charges. Jackson was sentenced to twelve years in federal prison as part of plea bargain in which he admitted to firing at least twenty rounds during the incident. The length of the sentence was said to have been influenced by his previous gun-related convictions.

In July 2005, Lil' Kim was sentenced to one year in prison, thirty days home detention upon release from custody, and three years of probation. She served the entirety of her sentence at the Federal Detention Center, Philadelphia in Center City, Philadelphia. She was released on July 3, 2006, after serving approximately 12 months. Lil' Kim, Federal Bureau of Prisons (BOP) Register #56198-054, was released from BOP supervision on August 2, 2006.

On June 9, 2014, Jones gave birth to a daughter.

Jones identifies as a Christian.

Feuds

Foxy Brown 
Once high school friends, Lil' Kim and Foxy Brown originally remained close despite becoming associates of clashing hip hop groups Junior M.A.F.I.A. and The Firm, respectively. In 1995, they collaborated with Da Brat for the remix of  "No One Else" by Total. The following year, they were featured in the Hot 97 NY Fashion Show, and additionally appeared on the covers of The Source and Vibe. However, their first dispute developed after both of their debut studio albums were scheduled for release a week apart in November 1996.

Media outlets noted similarities between the sleeve covers of Lil' Kim's Hard Core and Brown's Ill Na Na, where the two were shown wearing the same outfit. In 1997, the feud led to the deterioration of their friendship, and resulted in the cancellation of a collaborative album Thelma & Louise. Brown noted that the breakdown of their relationship was influenced by their conflicting entourages. They first attempted a reconciliation in 1998 after Lil' Kim called Brown and her mother after the two were held at gunpoint during a house burglary.

In January 1999, critics noted the track "My Life" from Brown's second studio effort Chyna Doll for being an "open appeal" to Brown's friendship with Lil' Kim, in which she cited the relationship being "lost for pride", but also contradicted herself after making attacks on "pointed mistresses". Critics indicated the records were in subtle use to diss Lil' Kim, especially since during this time, Brown had been supporting Lil' Kim's rival Faith Evans in multiple interviews. In February 1999, a significant part of the media took note of Brown "suddenly sound[ing] 'exactly' like Lil' Kim".

In late May 1999, Lil' Cease's "Play Around", featuring Lil' Kim and Diddy, was released to radio airwaves and was set to be featured on Cease's debut The Wonderful World of Cease A Leo. In the song, after Lil' Kim's guest rap, Diddy recites: "Stop trying to sound like her too bitches"; a subliminal diss aimed at Foxy. The line spurred enough controversy that various media sources went on to remark: "It's finally coming out. Foxy Brown bites worse than a pit bull." Additionally, Lil' Kim's guest appearance on Mobb Deep's "Quiet Storm (Remix)" and her second album's title track, "The Notorious K.I.M.", were released as diss records to Foxy Brown.

Angered by Lil' Kim's response, Brown collaborated with longtime associates Capone-N-Noreaga on the track, "Bang, Bang." In the track, Brown mimicked Lil' Kim's interpolation of MC Lyte's 10% Dis, and went on to recite: "You and Diddy y'all kill me with that subliminal shit." Towards the ending of her verse, Brown attacked Lil' Kim's grieving for the loss of Biggie Smalls by remarking: "Let the nigga [Biggie] rest in peace, and hop off his dick, bitch do you."

On February 26, 2001, at 3 p.m., when Lil' Kim had left New York radio station Hot 97, a shooting broke out; over twenty shots were fired between two groups of three men. One of the men in the groups was Capone, one-half member of Capone-N-Noreaga, who was entering the Hot 97 building in promotion of interviewer DJ Clue's new album, The Professional 2, which happened to have also featured Lil' Kim. An affiliate, Efrain Ocasio, from Capone's entourage was shot in the back; both parties from Lil' Kim and Capone denied any involvement in the shooting. However, a motive behind the shooting was later determined; detectives informed The New York Daily News that it was a result of the verses Foxy Brown recited in "Bang, Bang".

Shaken up by the incident, Brown tried to reach out to Lil' Kim in hopes of settling a truce. Brown stated, "I really don't know how it started. But Russell [Simmons] and I, we got together, and I said, 'Russell, I want to call a truce.' I want to have a sit-down with Kim. I don't care what it is. Let's just end it. We can even do a collaboration. We're bigger than this. If it has to start with me, let it start with me." Brown extended an olive branch to Lil' Kim's camp, however Lil' Kim had cut all ties with Diddy and Bad Boy associates and wanted no communication with Brown whatsoever. On July 6, 2005, Lil' Kim was sentenced to prison for three counts of perjury and one count of conspiracy.

During the 4-year span leading up to Lil' Kim's sentencing, Brown and Lil' Kim began to exchange subtle diss records towards each other, among them included Lil' Kim's La Bella Mafia, "Quiet", and "Guess Who's Back"; and in turn, Brown's Ill Na Na 2: The Fever and various mixtape freestyles. In the midst of the diss records, Brown was interviewed by Doug Banks in 2003 to disclose any further details pertaining to her dispute with Lil' Kim. Brown claimed that Lil' Kim was allegedly jealous that Biggie was to include Brown in his Junior Mafia collective. Brown also added that a tell-all book disclosing the feud would be released in Christmas of 2003. In her final regards to the dispute, Brown stated: "Kim is the only female artist that keeps me on my toes. She's the only one that I can look at; and any other artist that says they don't have that one person that keeps them driven... is lying."

Following her release from prison, Lil' Kim no longer acknowledged Brown. Brown, on the other hand, has consistently targeted Lil' Kim as a prime basis in her music and concert venues since Lil' Kim's prison release.

On May 17, 2012, Lil' Kim attended an interview with radio show, The Breakfast Club. When asked about whether or not she had spoken to Brown at all in recent years, Lil' Kim replied, "I don't even know her. And when I say that; I don't know who she is to these days. I wouldn't even know what her voice sounds like."

Nicki Minaj 
Lil' Kim has been embroiled in a feud with fellow rapper Nicki Minaj since Minaj's success with Pink Friday. With Lil' Kim and media critics noticing resemblances with her on the Sucka Free mixtape, Lil' Kim accused Minaj of copying her image saying, "If you are going to steal my swag, you gonna have to pay. Something gotta give. You help me, I help you. That's how it goes to me." Minaj's single "Roman's Revenge" with Eminem was believed by critics to be a response to Lil' Kim's comments, although at the time she denied this.

Minaj responded to the situation in an interview on The Angie Martinez show, saying "She picked a fight with Foxy, then she picked a fight with Eve, then she picked a fight with Remy, then it was Mrs. Wallace, then it was Nicki Minaj. Every time you in the news, it's 'cause you gettin' at somebody! Where's your music? Put your music out, and when I see your name on Billboard, that's when I'll respond to you. Other than that, goodbye. It's Barbie, bitch."

Lil' Kim reignited the feud following the release of her mixtape Black Friday, an album that directly referenced Nicki Minaj, via her debut album title and freestyling on Minaj's songs such as "Did It On'em" (that became "Pissin' On'em"); and with artwork that showed Lil' Kim decapitating Minaj with a sword. A fragment of Minaj's diss track "Tragedy" was released online in April 2011, featuring lyrics "Pink Friday, Eminem, 8 Mile/ It must hurt to sell your album on PayPal." Following the release of Minaj's second album, Pink Friday: Roman Reloaded, critics suggested that the tracks "Stupid Hoe" may have contained attacks at Lil' Kim. Lil' Kim later suggested in an interview with 105's Breakfast Club that the song "Automatic" from Minaj's second album was similar to her unreleased material, also calling Minaj "obnoxious" and "catty".

However, in a 2018 interview with Genius, Minaj alluded to the situation with Lil' Kim, seemingly confirming that the track "Roman's Revenge" was about the feud, saying, "Someone got at me. A veteran got at me, and I hit them with 'Roman's Revenge' and then I kept on going." In 2021, Lil' Kim stated on the red carpet of the BET Awards that she would like to do a Verzuz with Minaj.

Legacy 
 Several media outlets have cited Lil' Kim as the "Queen of Rap", and as the alias she uses, "Queen Bee". Newsweek has called her the "First Lady of Rap", with editor Allison Samuels writing in 2000 that she has "transcended the male-dominated world of rap to become one of America's sassiest, most engaging icons".

Lil' Kim's music catalogue features undertones of sex-positive feminism and the importance of female pleasure, instead of the man as the "dominant priority," through explicit lyrics about sex. Dazed considered her "the first high-profile female rapper to flip the script on female objectification in the rap industry". For NMEs editor Jordan Bassett, she "out-filthed the male rappers at every turn."

According to BBC News, Hard Core (1996) was the most successful debut album by a female hip hop artist at the time; the album saw her "inhabit the territory of sexual edginess and hardcore rap, traditionally the preserve inhabited by male artists." In 2000, Los Angeles Times writer Isaac Guzman expressed that the her debut solo album created a path for a new wave of female rappers, with her at the forefront of her generation, and established her as "the raunchiest, hardest, sexiest, most glamorous woman in all of hip-hop."

During that time, several new female hip hop artists modeled themselves after her stylistically. Placing Hard Core at number 80 on their list of "Best Rap Albums of the 90s", Complex stated, "when Lil Kim released her debut album—women in hip-hop finally had options, paths to follow and models [...] she was the raunchiest woman you ever heard on the mic." The Village Voice writer Joan Morgan considered that the album "transformed her into a cultural icon", and opined that it put an emphasis on sex appeal, looks, and packaging as a priority for female rappers. A Camera Obscura publication noted her as one of the late twentieth-century "self-marketers of female trouble" in music, along with Janet Jackson and Tina Turner.

Aside from music, Lil' Kim is also known for her risk-taking and luxurious approach to fashion that inspired many artists; she has been cited as a fashion icon, as well as one of the most influential rappers of all time by various media outlets. Vogue editor-at-large André Leon Talley called her "the black Madonna." Lil' Kim has been cited as an inspiration for designers such as Marc Jacobs, Versace, and Giorgio Armani, according to Vogue. In 2020, XXL wrote that "twenty-five years later, no rapper is more influential to the new female rhymers".

Some artists who have credited Kim as influence include Rihanna, Cardi B, Megan Thee Stallion, Kash Doll, Bree Runway, Teyana Taylor, Doja Cat, Rosalía, Hitmaka, Casanova, Spice, Zaytoven, Stefflon Don, Flo Milli, Saweetie, and Erica Banks. Actress Taraji P. Henson has stated that Lil' Kim inspired her portrayal of Empire character Cookie Lyon.

Awards and nominations 

Throughout her career, Lil' Kim has earned numerous honors and awards. Lil' Kim's debut album Hard Core was certified double platinum by the RIAA, and is considered a classic hip-hop album. As of 2007, Lil' Kim has sold over 15 million albums worldwide. Her songs "No Time", "Big Momma Thang" and "Ladies Night" were listed on Complex Magazine's "The 50 Best Rap Songs By Women", at number 24,  13, and 7, respectively. Her song "Lady Marmalade" with Pink, Christina Aguilera, and Mýa, is one of the best-selling singles of all time worldwide, with sales of over 5.1 million worldwide. Lady Marmalade went number one on the US Billboard Hot 100, making her one of only a few female rappers to have a number one on that chart. The song won a 2002 Grammy Award in the category of "Best Pop Collaboration with Vocals".

Lil' Kim was ranked as one of the top 50 greatest MCs of all time in Kool Moe Dee's 2003 book, There's a God on the Mic. In 2012, Lil' Kim was honorably listed on VH1's "100 Greatest Women In Music" at number 45, making her the fourth highest position for a female rapper. In 2014, Lil' Kim was included in Billboards list of the "31 Female Rappers Who Changed Hip-Hop". In 2016, VH1 honored Lil' Kim with VH1 Hip-Hop Honors and WEEN Award honored Kim with Icon Award because of her contribution to hip hop.

In June 2018, Lil' Kim was honored with a proclamation by the New York City Council's Black, Latino, and Asian Caucus (BLAC) as part of the annual African-American Music Appreciation Month for her contributions to hip-hop. Along with the proclamation, she also accepted the New York City 12th Council District Arts and Music Award and the city's Power Of Influence Award. In 2019, Lil' Kim was honored by BET Hip Hop Awards with the I Am Hip Hop Award.

Discography

Studio albums
 Hard Core (1996)
 The Notorious K.I.M. (2000)
 La Bella Mafia (2003)
 The Naked Truth (2005)
 9 (2019)

Collaboration albums
 Conspiracy with Junior M.A.F.I.A. (1995)

Tours 
Headlining
 The Notorious K.I.M. Tour (2000)
 2010 Tour (2010)
 Return of the Queen Tour (2012)

Joint tours
 No Way Out Tour  (1997–1998)
 Winterbeatz Australia  (2011)
 Bad Boy Family Reunion Tour  (2016)

Filmography

Films

Video games

Television

See also
 Honorific nicknames in popular music
 List of artists who reached number one in the United States
 List of Billboard Hot 100 number-one singles of 2001
 Billboard Year-End Hot 100 singles of 2001

References

Further reading

External links
 
 
 

 
1974 births
Living people
African-American Christians
African-American women rappers
African-American women singers
American dance musicians
American perjurers
American LGBT rights activists
Atlantic Records artists
East Coast hip hop musicians
Feminist rappers
Grammy Award winners
Hardcore hip hop artists
HIV/AIDS activists
MNRK Music Group artists
Participants in American reality television series
People from Bedford–Stuyvesant, Brooklyn
Rappers from Brooklyn
The Notorious B.I.G.
20th-century American rappers
21st-century American rappers
20th-century women rappers
21st-century women rappers
20th-century African-American women singers
21st-century African-American women singers